Molly Ritson (born 12 August 1999) is an Australian rules footballer who played for Brisbane and Gold Coast in the AFL Women's competition (AFLW).

Early life
Ritson grew up on the Gold Coast and attended Aquinas College throughout her upbringing.  She began playing junior football with Surfers Paradise at a young age before switching to Southport and ultimately Bond University in an attempt to be drafted. Her decision paid off when the Brisbane Lions drafted her with the 14th pick in the 2017 AFL Women's rookie draft.

AFLW career
Ritson was not given the opportunity to debut for Brisbane due to an injury while contracted in 2018 and was subsequently delisted at the end of the season. She returned to Bond University for the 2019 season where she impressed enough to be selected by her hometown team, the Gold Coast Suns, to be a part of their inaugural 2020 season list. Ritson made her AFLW debut against Greater Western Sydney in round 1 of the 2020 season. At the end of the 2021 season, Ritson was delisted by the Gold Coast after playing nine matches across two seasons.

References

External links 

1999 births
Living people
Sportspeople from the Gold Coast, Queensland
Sportswomen from Queensland
Australian rules footballers from Queensland
Gold Coast Football Club (AFLW) players